Åsbo Southern Hundred was a hundred of Skåne in Sweden. Until The Treaty of Roskilde in 1658, it was in Denmark.

See also 
Åsbo Northern Hundred divided between Halland and Skåne
List of hundreds of Sweden

Subdivisions of Sweden